The 2003 Regal Scottish Open was a professional ranking snooker tournament that took place between 5–13 April 2003 at the Royal Highland Centre in Edinburgh, Scotland. It was the seventh and penultimate ranking event of the 2002/2003 season.

David Gray won his first ranking title by defeating Mark Selby 9–7 in the final. This was Gray's only ranking final victory, and was Selby's first appearance in a ranking final. The defending champion, Stephen Lee, was defeated in the quarter-finals by John Higgins.

This was the final tournament held under the Scottish Open name, being re-branded the following season as the Players Championship before being discontinued. The tournament would be revived under the Scottish Open name in 2016.


Prize fund
The breakdown of prize money for this year is shown below:

Winner: £82,500
Runner-up: £42,500
Semi-final: £21,250
Quarter-final: £11,700
Last 16: £9,600
Last 32: £7,800
Last 48: £4,000
Last 64: £3,150

Last 80: £2,150
Last 96: £1,450

Stage one highest break: £1,800
Stage two highest break: £7,500

Stage one maximum break: £5,000
Stage two maximum break: £20,000

Total: £597,200

Main draw

Final

Qualifying

Round 1 
Best of 9 frames

Round 2–4

Century breaks

Qualifying stage centuries

 141  Stuart Bingham
 138  Shaun Murphy
 136  Rory McLeod
 135  Michael Holt
 133  Lee Spick
 128, 113  Kristjan Helgason
 121  David Gray
 120  Bradley Jones
 120  Wayne Brown

 119  Johl Younger
 119  Tony Drago
 117  David Gilbert
 115  Adrian Gunnell
 114  Ian McCulloch
 112, 104, 101  Ryan Day
 110  Robin Hull
 108, 100  Mark Gray
 103  Nick Walker

Televised stage centuries

 142, 116  Ali Carter
 136, 120, 102, 101, 100  Stephen Hendry
 134, 100  Mark Selby
 131, 124  Ken Doherty
 128, 102  John Higgins

 117  Mark King
 101  Matthew Stevens
 101  Ian McCulloch
 101  Quinten Hann
 101  Anthony Hamilton

References

2003
Scottish Open
Open (Snooker), 2003
International sports competitions in Edinburgh
2000s in Edinburgh